Tommy Janor Hollis (March 22, 1954 – September 9, 2001) was an American film, television, and stage actor.

A native of Jacksonville, Texas, his first major film appearance was in Ghostbusters as the mayor's aide (1984). He played Earl Little in the Spike Lee-directed movie Malcolm X (1992).

Hollis died in New York City from complications of diabetes. He had no children.

Filmography

References

External links

1954 births
2001 deaths
Male actors from Texas
American male film actors
African-American male actors
20th-century American male actors
20th-century African-American people
Deaths from diabetes